Johannes Bernardus (Han) van Loghem (1881–1940) was a Dutch architect, furniture designer and town planner.

Biography

He was born in Haarlem as the son of a bulb grower and after attending high school at the local HBS, he continued his education at the Polytechnical school there for civic engineering. According to the RKD he studied in Delft during the years 1905–1909 and was influenced by Frank Lloyd Wright and Hendrik Petrus Berlage. After graduation he became an architect in Haarlem where he married the textile artist Berta Neumeier. In 1912 they moved into the house of his own design on the Spaarne river called "Steenhaag".

He received many commissions for city planning, including the projects based on the garden city movement Rosenhaghe, Betondorp, Ter Cleef, and Tuinwijk Zuid, which was built on the other side of the street from his own house. One of his patrons was the local electricity company, for whom he designed 80 aggregate transformer buildings.

From 1917 to 1919 he was a member of the board of directors of the league of Dutch architects and he taught technical theory at the HBO in Amsterdam from 1916–1925. In 1919 he was one of the founders (which included Berlage, Henriette Roland Holst, Clara Wichmann and the artist Theo van Doesburg) of the League of Revolutionary-Socialist Intellectuals. The league only lasted 3 years, possibly because its members were more artistically than politically engaged. He died in Haarlem.

References

J.B. van Loghem by Wim de Wagt

1881 births
1940 deaths
Dutch architects
Artists from Haarlem